Russell Johnstone (born 11 March 1965) is an Australian equestrian. He competed in two events at the 1996 Summer Olympics.

References

External links
 

1965 births
Living people
Australian male equestrians
Olympic equestrians of Australia
Equestrians at the 1996 Summer Olympics